Tita is an unclassified Benue–Congo language of Nigeria.

References

Languages of Nigeria
Benue–Congo languages